Erik Harry Stenqvist (25 December 1893 – 9 December 1968) was a Swedish road racing cyclist. Stenqvist competed in the 175 km road race at the 1920 Summer Olympics and won an individual gold and team silver medals.

Stenqvist was born in the United States to Swedish parents and later moved to Sweden, where he won national titles in the team (1912–1915) and individual events (10 km in 1915 and 1920 and 100 km in 1920). He was selected for the 1912 Stockholm Olympic, but only as a substitute. In 1916, his amateur status was revoked by the Swedish Cycling Federation, but later restored after a successful appeal. At the 1920 Olympics Stenqvist was initially declared a bronze medalist, but then promoted to the first place after subtracting 4 minutes he had to wait at a railroad crossing.

References

External links

profile

1893 births
1968 deaths
Swedish male cyclists
Olympic cyclists of Sweden
Cyclists at the 1920 Summer Olympics
Olympic gold medalists for Sweden
Olympic silver medalists for Sweden
Olympic medalists in cycling
Medalists at the 1920 Summer Olympics
Cyclists from Chicago
Swedish expatriates in the United States
19th-century Swedish people
20th-century Swedish people